East Greenwich is a town and the county seat of Kent County, Rhode Island. The population was 14,312 at the 2020 census. East Greenwich is the wealthiest municipality within the state of Rhode Island. It is part of the Providence metropolitan statistical area and the Greater Boston combined statistical area.

Formed as Greenwich in 1677, it was named for Greenwich, England. It was renamed Dedford in 1686 but reverted to its original name in 1689. In 1741 the more rural western three quarters of the town was set off as West Greenwich, the remaining quarter of it thenceforth being called East Greenwich. Until 1854, it was one of the five state capitals for Rhode Island. The General Assembly, when meeting in East Greenwich, used the local courthouse, which is today the town hall. East Greenwich Village is located in the northeastern part of the town and extends north about  into the city of Warwick, Rhode Island. The town is now known for its waterfront, renowned school district, and downtown restaurant/shopping district.

History
East Greenwich, the 8th oldest town in Rhode Island, was founded in October 1677 by the General Assembly in an attempt to solidify land claims against those of Connecticut and the Narragansett Proprietors. The Assembly designated 5,000 acres to the new town and provided lots to settlers who would agree to live there—land was deeded to 48 men who had fought in King Phillip's War against the Wampanoag. Locals quickly took the assembly up on this offer, and the quick establishment of the town helped hold back plans of Connecticut in pushing their border eastward. East Greenwich was therefore the only Rhode Island town established by an act of government, not commercial interests. In 1687, the Narragansett Proprietors attempted to settle land north of Wickford which overlapped with the land of East Greenwich; however, the Massachusetts governor Sir Edmund Andros, who had authority to settle the dispute, ruled in favor of the existing East Greenwich settlement.

In the 18th century, the government released previously reserved waterfront property in small lots. Beginning in 1711, the local government granted these lots to any person who would pay one shilling and promise to build a commercial building of a minimum size. By 1725, a community had developed, complete with a schoolhouse and a graveyard. However, citizens of the town complained that attending town meetings was too difficult due to the size of the town, which prompted the splitting of West Greenwich into its own town in 1741. The town erected a courthouse when East Greenwich was designated the shire town of the newly formed Kent County, which had been separated from Providence County in 1750. On June 12, 1772, a resolution was passed by the Rhode Island State Assembly to form the United States' first Navy in East Greenwich, which included two ships, the Katy and the Washington. The Assembly put Captain Abraham Whipple in charge of this new military branch and these ships, with the formal title commodore.

In its colonial days, the town was also home to followers of a former Quaker who, after a severe illness, claimed to have died and been resurrected as the "Public Universal Friend"; these followers financed a meeting house within the town.

Most of East Greenwich's neighborhood of Scalloptown was destroyed by 1926, after a mass eviction order by the town council left most of its buildings vacant. Scalloptown had been the attention of reformers in town for some time. Scalloptown was the site of "Neighborhood House", a settlement house run by Sarah Fernandis from 1908 on. But, historian Catherine Streich argues, the racial prejudices of white East Greenwich residents and their dwindling desire for social reform lead to their destruction of Scalloptown.

Geography

East Greenwich is a coastal town, located on the western side of Narragansett Bay. Of its total area of 16.71 square miles, 16.58 square miles is land and 0.14 square miles is water. 20 percent of the land in East Greenwich consists of undeveloped woods and farmland, although development continues to bring this proportion down.

Various roads form approximate borders with some of its neighboring towns. Division Street sits between East Greenwich and Warwick, to the north and west until Route 2. South and east is North Kingstown which is roughly separated from East Greenwich by Frenchtown Road.

Climate
According to the Köppen climate classification, East Greenwich has either a hot-summer humid continental climate (abbreviated Dfa), or a hot-summer humid sub-tropical climate (abbreviated Cfa), depending on the isotherm used.

Schools

East Greenwich is home to six public schools in its school district. The district contains two zoning districts for its elementary schools. Students in one district, which primarily consists of households east of South County Trail, attend Meadowbrook Farms Elementary from kindergarten to second grade, then proceed to George R. Hanaford School for third grade to fifth grade. Most students who live west of South County Trail will attend Frenchtown Elementary for kindergarten to second grade before attending James H. Eldredge School for third grade to fifth grade. All students in the public school district then attend Archie R. Cole Middle School for sixth grade to eighth grade. The district's single high school is East Greenwich High School.

In 2015, Newsweek magazine ranked East Greenwich High School first in Rhode Island and 186th in the United States.

The town also contains the Our Lady Of Mercy Regional School, a private Catholic school serving students from pre-kindergarten to eighth grade. East Greenwich was also home to the East Greenwich Academy, an eminent preparatory school; however, the school closed in 1943.

East Greenwich is also home to the main campus of the New England Institute of Technology, known informally as New England Tech. The site was purchased by the school in 2007, and opened to students in summer 2011. A major expansion begun in 2014 added dormitories and new instructional space. The campus includes a 265,000 square foot facility dedicated to classrooms, technical labs, medical suites for training simulations, and administrative services.

Library

The current East Greenwich Free Library, at 82 Pierce Street, was endowed by Daniel Albert Peirce in 1913. Pierce was a local resident and co-founder of the Narragansett Electric Company. The library building is built of granite from Coventry, Rhode Island, and was dedicated on June 29, 1915. The library includes special collections on Rhode Island history and genealogy.

Waterfront
Many restaurants, bars, and clubs sit on the waterfront. East Greenwich Cove also has ample boat parking. There is also a public dock good for fishing and eating, and a dock with a small beach. Across from the coast is Goddard Memorial State Park, which has many beaches including Sandy Point and has easy access from East Greenwich Cove.

Scalloptown Park has been completed at the southern end of Greenwich Cove, built atop the old town landfill. However, it is not part of historical Scalloptown, which was another name for the waterfront in earlier times. Home to a poor community of squatters in the late nineteenth century to the earliest twentieth century, Scalloptown became a community untethered from the rest of East Greenwich. In contrast to the other villages in East Greenwich, Scalloptown consisted primarily of poor whites and African Americans. The true Scalloptown goes from the town dock down past the clubs to Finn's Marina.

Demographics

As of the United States Census of 2000, there were 12,948 people, 4,960 households, and 3,541 families residing in the town. The racial makeup of the town was 96.64% White, 0.69% African American, 0.06% Native American, 2.50% Asian, 0.01% Pacific Islander, 0.29% from other races, and 0.82% from two or more races. Hispanic or Latino of any race were 0.90% of the population.

There were 4,960 households, out of which 36.2% had children under the age of 18 living with them, 61.5% were married couples living together, 7.9% had a female householder with no husband present, and 28.6% were non-families. 24.2% of all households were made up of individuals, and 9.7% had someone living alone who was 65 years of age or older. The average household size was 2.58 and the average family size was 3.12.

In the town, the population was spread out, with 27.5% under the age of 18, 4.6% from 18 to 24, 26.6% from 25 to 44, 27.7% from 45 to 64, and 13.6% who were 65 years of age or older. The median age was 40 years. For every 100 females, there were 93.8 males. For every 100 females age 18 and over, there were 89.5 males.

The median income for a household in the town was $98,063, and the median income for a family was $130,221. Males had a median income of $101,578 versus $90,934 for females. The per capita income for the town was $58,593. About 2.5% of families and 4.7% of the population were below the poverty line, including 4.1% of those under age 18 and 7.0% of those age 66 or over.

In 2012–2016, according to the Rhode Island Department of Labor, the median family income was $142,648, the highest in Rhode Island.

East Greenwich and the adjacent Warwick neighborhoods of Cowesett and Potowomut are served by several media outlets: East Greenwich News (daily) East Greenwich Patch (daily), The East Greenwich Pendulum (weekly), The North East Independent (weekly) and East Greenwich magazine (monthly).

Government

In the Rhode Island Senate, East Greenwich is split in terms of representation. Most of the town is in the 35th District, currently represented by Democrat Bridget Valverde, while a tiny sliver of the northwestern quadrant of the town is in the 33rd District, which is currently represented by Democrat Leonidas P. Raptakis. In the Rhode Island House of Representatives, East Greenwich is in the 30th district represented by Democrat Justine Caldwell. At the federal level, all of East Greenwich is included in Rhode Island's 2nd congressional district and is represented by Democrat James R. Langevin.

In presidential elections, East Greenwich is one of the very few towns in deep blue Rhode Island that has a tendency to lean Republican. Barack Obama managed to carry the town by just over 4.5 points in the Democratic wave year of 2008 and in 2020, Joe Biden won East Greenwich by just over 23 points, marking the best performance for a Democratic presidential nominee in the town in over three decades. Biden also became the first major party candidate to win over 60% of the vote in the town since also then vice president George H. W. Bush.

National Historic Places

 Armory of the Kentish Guards
 Richard Briggs Farm
 East Greenwich Historic District
 Fry's Hamlet Historic District
 Kent County Courthouse
 Massie Wireless Station
 Tillinghast Mill Site
 Tillinghast Road Historic District
 Gen. James Mitchell Varnum House
 Clement Weaver-Daniel Howland House
 Col. Micah Whitmarsh House
 Windmill Cottage

Adjacent Towns

See also

 People from East Greenwich, Rhode Island
 New England Wireless and Steam Museum
 Hunt River
 List of newspapers in Rhode Island
 Rhode Island locations by per capita income
 Manor of East Greenwich

References

External links

 
 
 Varnum Continentals - Historic Museum & Armory
 East Greenwich Historical Preservation Society
 Feature article about the World War I Memorial Monument in front of East Greenwich Town Hall by the Varnum Continentals Historical Organization in East Greenwich, RI.

 
Towns in Kent County, Rhode Island
County seats in Rhode Island
Populated coastal places in Rhode Island
Providence metropolitan area
1677 establishments in Rhode Island
Towns in Rhode Island